Olga Baltazhy, nee Olga Hazanovich (born April 28, 1970, Zaporizhia, Ukrainian SSR) is a Ukrainian player in the International draughts. Many times champion of Ukraine in International draughts. Olga Baltazhy is a Women's International grandmaster (GMIF). She train by her husband vice president Ukrainian draughts federation Konstantin Baltazhy.

Career
Olga Baltazhy was European champion in 2014 and Women's Draughts Championship winners in blitz (2015). She took second place at 2001 Women's Draughts Championship, 2017 Women's Draughts Championship (rapid), was third at Women's Draughts Championship in 1995, 2003, 2009 (blitz) and 2012 (blitz), was second at Women's European Championship in 2000 and 2002.

Set a record for Ukraine in the number of boards in a simultaneous game – 100 (May 11, 2013).

In 1994 graduated Faculty of Economics Zaporizhzhya National University. From 2008 lived in Ivano-Frankivsk.

In 2015 Olga Baltazhy was awarded Order of Princess Olga.

World Championship

 1995 (3 place)
 1997 (6 place)
 1999 (7 place)
 2001 (2 place)
 2003 (3 place)
 2005 (9 place)
 2007 (9 place)
 2010 (5 place)
 2011 (9 place)
 2015 (15 place)
 2017 (9 place)

European Championship
 2000 (2 place)
 2002 (2 place)
 2004 (7 place)
 2006 (4 place)
 2008 (27 place)
 2010 (6 place)
 2012 (25 place)
 2014 (1 place)
 2016 (4 place)

References

External links
World Championship Women 1973 - 2011
Pfofile, FMJD
Pfofile, KNDB

1970 births
Living people
Soviet draughts players
Ukrainian draughts players
Players of international draughts